Phoenix Theatre may refer to:

Places

England 

Cockpit Theatre, 17th century theatre in London called the Phoenix after a fire
Phoenix Cinema, London

Phoenix Dance Theatre, a dance company in Leeds

Phoenix Picturehouse, Oxford

Phoenix Theatre, London, a West End theatre

Sue Townsend Theatre, formerly the Phoenix Theatre, in Leicester

United States 
Phoenix Theatre (New York City), an off-Broadway theatre (1953–1982)
Phoenix Theatre (Indianapolis), a professional alternative theatre
Phoenix Theatre (Phoenix), a regional theatre
Phoenix Theater, an all-ages club in Petaluma, California

Canada 
Phoenix Concert Theatre, Toronto

Italy 
 La Fenice (The Phoenix), an opera house in Venice, Italy

See also
Cockpit Theatre in London (extant 1616 – c. 1665), formally named The Phoenix

Lists of theatres